Chester Donald Watson (born  1 July 1938) is a former Jamaican cricketer. Watson played seven Tests for the West Indies in the late 1950s and early 1960s.

A fast bowler, Watson opened the bowling with Wes Hall and the two were accused by the English of intimidatory bowling during the England tour of the West Indies in 1959-60. English batsman Ken Barrington was hit on the elbow by a Watson bouncer during the series and others had near misses but West Indies champion allrounder Garry Sobers later claimed this was more due to the English batsmen being unaccustomed to West Indian pitches than intimidatory bowling.

Watson played as the professional for Church in the Lancashire League in 1962. He took 117 wickets at an average of 7.58 to lead the League averages and take Church to the championship.

References

Sources
 Sobers, G. (1988) Sobers: Twenty years at the top, Pan Books: London. .

1938 births
Living people
Commonwealth XI cricketers
Jamaican cricketers
West Indies Test cricketers
International Cavaliers cricketers
Jamaica cricketers
Delhi cricketers
People from Westmoreland Parish